KTBT (92.1 FM "92.1 The Beat") is a Top 40 (CHR) radio station, serving the Tulsa area. The iHeartMedia outlet broadcasts with an ERP of 27 kW and is licensed to Broken Arrow, Oklahoma. The station can be heard as far north as southeast Kansas.  Its studios are located at the Tulsa Event Center in Southeast Tulsa and its transmitter site is near Lookout Mountain in southwest Tulsa.

KTBT broadcasts in the HD digital format.

History

KTBT's format history includes Freeform Rock radio in the early 1970s as KTBA, Country as KGOW in the late 1970s and Adult Contemporary as "Sunny 92" KSNY. It switched formats to Top 40 as KELI-FM in the early 1980s, which also simulcasted with its AM counterpart KELI-1430 (Now Sports KTBZ (AM)) as 14K & 92K. It was also the home to Classical Music as KCMA from its previous home at 106.1 (Now KTGX). In 1995 the station flipped to Smooth Jazz as KOAS "92.1 The Oasis" giving Tulsa its first Smooth Jazz station at the time. The Smooth Jazz format was dropped in 1997 and flipped back to Top 40 as "92.1 Kiss-FM"

Before September 2005, 92.1 was known as KIZS "92.1 Kiss-FM." KIZS originally started out in 2002 as a 1990s/now type AC station before going full-time as a Hot AC in 2003.  After a year as a Hot AC and still seeing no ratings success, it started leaning toward Mainstream Top 40 and went full-time in mid-2004. This lasted only for a short time.

On September 23, 2005, rhythmic contemporary station KTBT moved over to sister station 92.1 KIZS and replaced their Mainstream Top 40 format. KTBT, which debuted its format in 2003 was originally at 101.5 where its previous format was Christian Rock (and whose move sparked outrage from listeners). But it was also signal challenged due to spotty coverage. The move gave The Beat better coverage in the area. The Mainstream Top 40 format was retained on 92.1's HD-2 station which can be heard with HD Radio Receivers. The 101.5 frequency was then switched to Clear Channel's Spanish language La Preciosa network featuring Spanish Oldies.

As of 2010, KTBT has shifted its format to contemporary hit radio and gave a similar format to KHTT.  Mediabase & Nielsen BDS continued to bill the station as a rhythmic contemporary until 2012.  This was mainly due to KRAV shifting from adult top 40 to adult contemporary and regarding format adult contemporary station KBEZ giving way to adult hits.

In the late 1960s a different KTBT was on-air in Garden Grove, CA at 94.3; with a format of Acid-Rock the World's First Acid-Rock Station; owned by Tel-Audio Incorporated.  The owner used the station as a tax write-off; and every time it began showing a profit, he changed the format.  It later was sold and became KIKF country 94.3.

External links
KTBT station website

References

TBT
Contemporary hit radio stations in the United States
Radio stations established in 2003
1970 establishments in Oklahoma
IHeartMedia radio stations